The Lancelin Island skink (Ctenotus lancelini), also known commonly as the Lancelin south-west ctenotus, is a species of skink, a lizard in the family Scincidae. The species is endemic to Australia.

Etymology
The specific name, lancelini, refers to Lancelin Island, Western Australia.

Geographic range
C. lancelini is found on Lancelin Island.

Reproduction
C. lancelini is oviparous.

See also
Lancelin Island
Lancelin, Western Australia

References

Further reading
Cogger HG (2014). Reptiles and Amphibians of Australia, Seventh Edition. Clayton, Victoria, Australia: CSIRO Publishing. xxx + 1,033 pp. .
Ford J (1969). "Distribution and variation of the skink Ctenotus labillardieri (Gray) of southwestern Australia". J. Royal Soc. Western Australia 51 (3): 68–75. (Ctenotus labillardieri lancelini, new subspecies, p. 69).
Storr GM, Smith LA, Johnstone RE (1999). Lizards of Western Australia. I. Skinks, Revised Edition. Perth: Western Australian Museum. 291 pp. .
Wilson, Steve; Swan, Gerry (2013). A Complete Guide to Reptiles of Australia, Fourth Edition. Sydney: New Holland Publishers. 522 pp. .

Reptiles of Western Australia
Vulnerable fauna of Australia
Reptiles described in 1969
Taxonomy articles created by Polbot
Skinks of Australia
Ctenotus
Taxa named by Julian Ralph Ford